Matthew Ebden took the title, beating countryman Jordan Thompson 7–5, 6–3

Seeds

  Matthew Ebden (champion)
  Jordan Thompson (final)
  Brydan Klein (semifinals)
  Luke Saville (first round)
  Connor Smith (second round)
  Li Zhe (quarterfinals)
  Alex Bolt (quarterfinals)
  Marinko Matosevic (first round)

Draw

Finals

Top half

Bottom half

References
 Main Draw
  Qualifying Draw

2015 ATP Challenger Tour
2015 Singles
2015 in Australian tennis